The 2023 Allegheny County Executive election will be held on November 7, 2023, to elect the next chief executive of Allegheny County, Pennsylvania.

The incumbent county executive, Rich Fitzgerald, is ineligible to run for a fourth consecutive term due to term limits. The 2023 election will thus be the first open seat race for county executive since Fitzgerald was elected in 2011, and the winner is expected to become the fourth individual to hold the position of county executive since it was established under the home-rule charter in 2000, following Jim Roddey, Dan Onorato, and Fitzgerald.

The primary election will be held on May 16.

Democratic primary

Candidates

Declared 
 Liv Bennett, county councilor from the 13th district (2019–present)
 Dave Fawcett, lawyer and former Republican at-large county councilor (1999–2007)
 Sara Innamorato, state representative from the 21st district (2019–present)
 Michael Lamb, Pittsburgh City Controller (2008–present), former Allegheny County Prothonotary (2000–2008), candidate for mayor of Pittsburgh in 2005 and 2013, and candidate for Pennsylvania Auditor General in 2020
 John Weinstein, Allegheny County Treasurer (1999–present)

Declined 
 Bethany Hallam, at-large county councilor (2019–present) (running for reelection)

Endorsements

Republican primary

Candidates

Declared
 Joe Rockey, former PNC Financial Services executive

References

External links 
Official campaign websites
 Liv Bennett (D) for County Executive
 Sara Innamorato (D) for County Executive
 Michael Lamb (D) for County Executive
 Erin McClelland (D) for County Executive

Allegheny County Executive
Allegheny County Executive
Executive 2023 election